The Pilchuck River is a river in Snohomish County in the U.S. state of Washington. It is a tributary of the Snohomish River. The name is derived from Chinook Jargon pilpil ("blood", "red") and chuck ("water"), or "red water".

Course
The Pilchuck River originates in the Cascade Range. It flows generally west until it reaches Granite Falls, then it turns and flows south, passing by Lochsloy and Machias before emptying into the Snohomish River near Snohomish. The Snohomish River empties into Possession Sound, part of Puget Sound.

The Pilchuck River flows alongside the Centennial Trail from roughly Machias to Snohomish.

See also
 List of rivers of Washington

References

Rivers of Washington (state)
Rivers of Snohomish County, Washington